Pike Township is one of twelve townships in Warren County, Indiana, United States. According to the 2010 census, its population was 1,221 and it contained 529 housing units.

History
Pike Township was one of the four original townships in the county, formed on November 6, 1827.

Geography
The streams of Dry Branch, Foster Branch, Johnson Branch, Jordan Creek and Redwood Creek run through this township. Pike Township has two towns: West Lebanon, with a population of 793 and contains two-thirds of the residents of the township, and Old Town.

Cemeteries
The township contains two cemeteries.  Shanklin Hill Cemetery is a small burial ground located on the western border of the township.  West Lebanon Cemetery is much larger and is located southeast of the town.

Transportation
Indiana State Road 28 passes through the north end of the township on its route from the Illinois state line in the west to Williamsport (and beyond) in the east.  Indiana State Road 63 begins in Liberty Township just to the north, and runs through the western part of Pike Township on its way south to Terre Haute.  Indiana State Road 263 begins at State Road 63 and passes through West Lebanon, re-joining State Road 63 in the south part of the county.

Education
Pike Township is part of the Metropolitan School District of Warren County.  It contains the county's only high school, Seeger Memorial Junior-Senior High School, located on State Road 263 north of West Lebanon; one of the three elementary schools, Warren Central Elementary School, is co-located with Seeger.

Pike Township is served by the West Lebanon-Pike Township Public Library.

Government
Pike Township has a trustee who administers rural fire protection and ambulance service, provides relief to the poor, manages cemetery care, and performs farm assessment, among other duties. The trustee is assisted in these duties by a three-member township board. The trustees and board members are elected to four-year terms.

Pike Township is part of Indiana's 8th congressional district, Indiana House of Representatives District 42, and Indiana State Senate District 38.

Climate and weather 

References

 
 United States Census Bureau TIGER/Line Shapefiles

Bibliography

External links

Townships in Warren County, Indiana
1827 establishments in Indiana
Populated places established in 1827
Townships in Indiana